Lucas Silva Fonseca (born 2 August 1985) is a Brazilian footballer who plays for Esporte Clube Bahia as a central defender.

Club career
On 18 January 2015, Lucas Fonseca had his contract with Bahia terminated by mutual consent. On 19 January, he transferred to Chinese Super League side Tianjin Teda.

Fonseca was widely ridiculed after a match between Bahia and Flamengo when the center back's blatant simulation earned him a second yellow card in the thirtieth minute. Afterwards many internet memes and videos sprang up poking fun of Fonseca's dive.

Career statistics

Honours
Bahia
Copa do Nordeste: 2017, 2021
Campeonato Baiano: 2014, 2018, 2019, 2020

References

External links
 

1985 births
Sportspeople from Minas Gerais
Living people
Brazilian footballers
Association football defenders
Campeonato Brasileiro Série A players
Campeonato Brasileiro Série B players
União São João Esporte Clube players
Guarani FC players
Mogi Mirim Esporte Clube players
Esporte Clube Bahia players
Chinese Super League players
Tianjin Jinmen Tiger F.C. players
Brazilian expatriate footballers
Brazilian expatriate sportspeople in China
Expatriate footballers in China